Mathematical Biology is a two-part monograph on mathematical biology first published in 1989 by the applied mathematician James D. Murray. It is considered to be a classic in the field and sweeping in scope.

Part I: An Introduction 
Part I of Mathematical Biology covers population dynamics, reaction kinetics, oscillating reactions, and reaction-diffusion equations.

 Chapter 1: Continuous Population Models for Single Species
 Chapter 2: Discrete Population Models for a Single Species
 Chapter 3: Models for Interacting Populations
 Chapter 4: Temperature-Dependent Sex Determination (TSD)
 Chapter 5: Modelling the Dynamics of Marital Interaction: Divorce Prediction and Marriage Repair
 Chapter 6: Reaction Kinetics
 Chapter 7: Biological Oscillators and Switches
 Chapter 8: BZ Oscillating Reactions
 Chapter 9: Perturbed and Coupled Oscillators and Black Holes
 Chapter 10: Dynamics of Infectious Diseases
 Chapter 11: Reaction Diffusion, Chemotaxis, and Nonlocal Mechanisms
 Chapter 12: Oscillator-Generated Wave Phenomena
 Chapter 13: Biological Waves: Single-Species Models
 Chapter 14: Use and Abuse of Fractals

Part II: Spatial Models and Biomedical Applications 
Part II of Mathematical Biology focuses on pattern formation and applications of reaction-diffusion equations. Topics include: predator-prey interactions, chemotaxis, wound healing, epidemic models, and morphogenesis.

 Chapter 1: Multi-Species Waves and Practical Applications
 Chapter 2: Spatial Pattern Formation with Reaction Diffusion Systems
 Chapter 3: Animal Coat Patterns and Other Practical Applications of Reaction Diffusion Mechanisms
 Chapter 4: Pattern Formation on Growing Domains: Alligators and Snakes
 Chapter 5: Bacterial Patterns and Chemotaxis
 Chapter 6: Mechanical Theory for Generating Pattern and Form in Development
 Chapter 7: Evolution, Morphogenetic Laws, Developmental Constraints and Teratologies
 Chapter 8: A Mechanical Theory of Vascular Network Formation
 Chapter 9: Epidermal Wound Healing
 Chapter 10: Dermal Wound Healing
 Chapter 11: Growth and Control of Brain Tumours
 Chapter 12: Neural Models of Pattern Formation
 Chapter 13: Geographic Spread and Control of Epidemics
 Chapter 14: Wolf Territoriality, Wolf-Deer Interaction and Survival

Impact 
Since its initial publication, the monograph has come to be seen as a highly influential work in the field of mathematical biology. It serves as the essential text for most high level mathematical biology courses around the world, and is credited with transforming the field from a niche subject into a standard research area of applied mathematics.

References

External links 

 Mathematical Biology I: An Introduction
 Mathematical Biology II: Spatial Models and Biomedical Applications 
Biology books
Mathematical and theoretical biology